The Hot & Spicy Mamitas were an American Latino comedy group based out of Los Angeles, California. The group included comedians Debi Guttierez, Sully Diaz, Marilyn Martinez, Lydia Nicole, Ludo Vika, and later, Dyana Ortelli. In 1994, these women joined forces and became the first all female Latina comedy group. They were instrumental in creating social change through comedy which benefitted both the female, and Latino minorities.

Members
 Sully Diaz
 Marilyn Martinez
 Lydia Nicole
 Dyana Ortelli
 Ludo Vika,

Media
In 1998, the Mamitas put out a self-titled comedy album with Uproar Entertainment.

References

American women comedians
American comedy troupes
Comedians from Los Angeles County
History of women in California